Nicho Bears and Bar is a gay bar in Zona Rosa, Mexico City, Mexico. Passport Magazine Joseph Pedro said the bar offers "low-key bear night[s] where you're assigned numbers for secret messages". In 2018, Alberto Cervantes of TimeOut included Nicho in his list of the city's 10 best gay bars.

In 2020, the space was turned into a temporary bazaar of bear memorabilia. This was to support the staff who saw decreased wages due to the COVID-19 pandemic.

See also

 LGBT culture in Mexico

References

External links
 Nicho Bears & Bar at Lonely Planet

Bear (gay culture)
Cuauhtémoc, Mexico City
LGBT nightclubs in Mexico
Mexico City